The 2012 FINA Women's Water Polo World League is played between February and June 2012 and open to all women's water polo national teams. After playing in groups within the same continent, eight teams qualify to play in a final tournament, called the Super Final in Changshu, China from 29 May - 3 June 2012. The two teams that reach the final of the Super Final will be the first teams to quality for the water polo tournament of the 2013 World Aquatics Championships in Barcelona.

In the world league, there are specific rules that do not allow matches to end in a draw. If teams are level at the end of the 4th quarter of any world league match, the match will be decided by a penalty shootout. Teams earn points in the standings in group matches as follows:
 Match won in normal time - 3 points
 Match won in shootout - 2 points
 Match lost in shootout - 1 point
 Match lost in normal time - 0 points

Draw

Americas
As there were only 3 entries, all teams in this region played in a single group.

Asia/Oceania
As there were only 4 entries, all teams in this region will play in a single group.

Europe
There were 8 entries into the league from Europe, and these were drawn into two groups of four teams. The teams were placed into groups based on their performance in the 2011 FINA Women's Water Polo World League.

Americas League
All teams played the other teams twice. All matches were held in various locations in Orange County, California, United States from 20–22 February 2012. The top two teams advanced to the Super Final.

Asia/Oceania League
All teams will play the other teams twice. The first round-robin will be held at the Shanghai Oriental Sports Center in Shanghai and the second round-robin will be held from 8–12 May 2012 at the Chiba International Swimming Complex in Narashino, Chiba, Japan. The winner will advance to the Super Final. As China has already qualified as the hosts, if they win the Asia/Oceania League, the second-placed team will advance.

Europe League
All teams will play the other teams in their group twice. All games in Group A will be played from 10–13 May 2012 in Syracuse, Sicily, Italy, and all games in Group B will be played from 10–13 May 2012 in Volos, Greece. The top two teams in each group will advance to the Super Final.

Group A

Group B

Super Final
 May, 29 - June, 3, 2012, Changshu, China.

Preliminary round: Group A

Preliminary round: Group B

Final round

Bronze-medal match

Final

Final ranking 

Team Roster
Betsey Armstrong, Heather Petri, Melissa Seidemann, Brenda Villa (C), Lauren Wenger, Maggie Steffens, Courtney Mathewson, Jessica Steffens, Elsie Windes, Kelly Rulon, Annika Dries, Kami Craig, Tumua Anae. Head coach: Adam Krikorian.

References 

2012
International water polo competitions hosted by China
Fina
World League, women